Trieste's trolleybus system was operational from 1935 until 1975.

History 

The first trolleybus route in Trieste, “la linea dei colli” (the hills route), was inaugurated in 1935 between the central Goldoni Square and Campo Marzio, a neighborhood in the south of the city near the new commercial port.

Before World War II., two more routes were created. In 1940 these routes were operational:
  4 Piazza Goldoni - Piazza Foraggi 
 10 Piazza Ciano – San Cilino 
 12 Piazza Goldoni - Campo Marzio
In the early 1950s, under the Allied Military Government of Free Territory of Trieste (1945-1954), the municipal transportation authority (A.C.E.G.A.T.) decided to replace the tramway with new trolleybus lines. More over, in 1952 the interurban line Trieste-Muggia began operation (Muggia is a little town just in the border with the "B Zone", at that time controlled by Yugoslavia). The line was over 6 miles long, and some of it was in a picturesque scenery next to the meridional shore of the Trieste's Gulf. The service between Trieste and Muggia until this time was operated by steamboats.

The trolleybus network began to shrink in 1958, when the night-time lines were cancelled. Even though route 21 opened in 1960, it was closed only 9 months later. In the late 1960s, the other routes were progressively being replaced by bus lines. The last trolleybus ran in Trieste in 1975 on route 19 (Stazione  Centrale - Via Flavia).

Overhead wiring was dismantled between 1975 and 1982. Some vehicles were scrapped, while others were sold to the Salerno transportation authority (A.T.A.C.S.).

Routes 

(in order of opening)

 When day-time routes were closed, bus lines with the same number took their place

Trieste, Goldoni Square in the 1950s. From the left, a Alfa Romeo 800 Garavini (611-620 batch) on route 15, a tram Stanga (401-428 batch) with trailer on route 9, a tram Stanga (429-448 batch) on route 3, two Alfa Romeo 140, probably on routes 5 and 11

Fleet 

(in order of registration)

See also 

List of trolleybus systems in Italy
Trams in Trieste
Trieste-Opicina Tramway

References

 Paolo Gregoris, Francesco Rizzoli e Claudio Serra, Giro d'Italia in filobus, Calosci, Cortona, 2003, pp. 144–149, .
 Roberto Carmeli, Trieste in filovia, casa editrice Danubio, Trieste.
 I Trasporti a Trieste, Del Bianco Editore, Trieste, 1981

Defunct trolleybus systems by city
History of Trieste
Trolleybus transport in Italy